Fozia Hashim is a former head of the High Court of Eritrea. She is a Muslim woman of Jeberti descent. In 1993, she was appointed to the post of Minister of Justice.

As the Minister of Justice she has been responsible for the reorganization of the Court system and the drafting of a new legal code. All Proclamations and legal regulations are vetted by her office. Under her leadership community courts have elected their magistrates.

References

Living people
People's Front for Democracy and Justice politicians
Eritrean judges
Women judges
Women government ministers of Eritrea
Justice ministers of Eritrea
Female justice ministers
20th-century women politicians
21st-century women politicians
1956 births